Metropolitan Nikodim (secular name Boris Georgiyevich Rotov , 15 October 1929 – 5 September 1978), was the Russian Orthodox metropolitan of Leningrad and Novgorod from 1963 until his death.

Nikodim was born in Frolovo in south-west Russia.
Ordained in 1960 at the age of 31, the youngest bishop in the Christian world at the time, he went on to become one of the six presidents of the World Council of Churches.

According to the Mitrokhin Archive, which claimed deep Communist penetration of the Russian Orthodox Church,  Nikodim was a KGB agent whose ecumenical activity with the Roman Catholic Church and the WCC served to further Soviet goals. The KGB assigned Nikodim the codename "Svyatoslav".
  
Nikodim is said to have participated in negotiating a secret 1960s agreement between Soviet and Vatican officials that authorized Eastern Orthodox participation in the Second Vatican Council in exchange for non-condemnation of atheistic communism during the conciliar assemblies.

Nikodim collapsed and died in 1978 while in Rome for the installation of Pope John Paul I. The new pope, who himself died a few weeks later, prayed over him in his final moments.

Bibliography 
 
 Васильева О. Ю. Тридцать лет спустя... К истории Поместного Собора 1971 г. // Церковь в истории России. — Сб. 5. М.: ИРИ РАН, 2003. — С. 314–323.
 
 Боровой В. М., прот. Митрополит Никодим и церковная ситуация середины XX века // Личность в Церкви и обществе: Материалы Международной научно-богословской конференции (Москва, 17-19 сентября 2001 г.). — М. : Московская высшая православно-христианская школа, 2003. — 448 с. — С. 215–226.
 В память вечную...: Материалы Минского научно-богословского семинара, посвященного памяти высокопреосвященнейшего Никодима (Ротова), митрополита Ленинградского и Новгородского (†1978) / сост., отв. за вып. Н. В. Артимович. — Минск : [б. и.], 2006. — 120 с.
 
 
 
 
 
 Шкаровский М. В. Ленинградская Академия и семинария в период испытаний. 1958—1978 годы // Санкт-Петербургские духовные школы в ХХ-XXI вв. — Т. 2. — М. : Издательство Санкт-Петербургской Православной Духовной Академии, 2016. — 512 с. — С. 8-188

References

1929 births
1978 deaths
People from Korablinsky District
Christian Peace Conference members
Burials at Nikolskoe Cemetery
Bishops of the Russian Orthodox Church